Jofre Cullell Estapé (born 10 March 1999) is a Spanish cross-country mountain biker and cyclo cross cyclist. 

He is from a family of keen cyclists who own a cycle shop in his hometown of Santa Coloma de Farners.

In 2017, Cullell won the European Junior Cross-country Championships. He also finished third overall in the 2019 UCI Under-23 XCO World Cup. He competed in the cross-country race at the delayed 2020 Summer Olympics in August, 2021 where he finished 15th.

Major results

Mountain bike

2016
 1st  National Junior XCO Championships
2017
 1st  European Junior XCO Championships
 1st  National Junior XCO Championships
2018
 1st  National Under-23 XCO Championships
2019
 1st  National Under-23 XCO Championships
 3rd Overall UCI Under-23 XCO World Cup
2020
 1st  National Under-23 XCO Championships
2021
 1st  National Under-23 XCO Championships

Cyclo-cross
2015–2016
 2nd National Junior Championships
2016–2017
 2nd National Junior Championships
2017–2018
 1st  National Under-23 Championships
2018–2019
 2nd National Under-23 Championships
2020–2021
 2nd National Under-23 Championships

References

1999 births
Living people
Spanish male cyclists
Cyclo-cross cyclists
People from Santa Coloma de Farners
Sportspeople from the Province of Girona
Spanish mountain bikers
Cyclists from Catalonia
Cyclists at the 2020 Summer Olympics
Olympic cyclists of Spain
21st-century Spanish people